Navigator Records is a small independent record label in the United Kingdom, specialising in folk and roots music. It is wholly owned by Proper Music Distribution and was launched in 2008.

Musicians who have recorded on Navigator Records include  Alyth, Jon Boden, Bellowhead, Bella Hardy, Boo Hewerdine, Benji Kirkpatrick, Sean Lakeman,  Lau, Merrymouth, Oysterband, Paper Aeroplanes, Kathryn Roberts, Georgia Ruth and Lucy Ward.

References

External links
 Official website

Navigator Records
2008 establishments in England
British independent record labels
Folk record labels
Record labels established in 2008
Record labels based in London